Abigail is a Venezuelan telenovela that was produced by and seen on Venezuela's Radio Caracas Televisión between 1988 and 1989.  It was written by Elizabeth Alezard, Alberto Gómez, Mariana Luján, Amparo Montalva, and María Helena Portas and directed by Tito Rojas.  This telenovela lasted 257 episodes and was distributed internationally by RCTV International. Starring Catherine Fulop and Fernando Carrillo. The antagonist is Hilda Abrahamz.

Synopsis 
It tells the story of the capricious Abigail Guzmán (Catherine Fulop) the only daughter of a wealthy businessman, beautiful and troubled, who falls in love with Professor Carlos Alfredo Ruiz Aponte (Fernando Carrillo) who teaches her literature classes at the San Lázaro school. Abigail manages to conquer professor Carlos Alfredo and they immediately have a son, whom she gives to an unknown taxi driver in a moment of mental delirium. Abigail will fight for many years to get her son back and to regain the love of Carlos Alfredo, whom she blames for the loss of her child. His son, Cheíto, will reappear years later one day when, out of necessity, he breaks into Abigaíl's mansion. Abigail will also have to deal with the twin sisters, María Clara (Hilda Abrahamz) and María Begoña (Hilda Abrahamz) who try to take away her love. The story will be an odyssey of a love that will overcome a wrong marriage, a crisis of madness, a son, some strange parents, until the happy union of Abigail and Carlos Alfredo.

Cast 
 Catherine Fulop as Abigail Guzmán de Ruiz
 Fernando Carrillo as Prof. Carlos Alfredo Ruiz Aponte
 Hilda Abrahamz as María Clara Martínez/María Begoña Martínez
 Roberto Moll as Álvaro dos Santos Ortiz
 Astrid Carolina Herrera as Amanda Riquelme
 Adolfo Cubas as Leonel Santana
 Inés María Calero as Bárbara Urdaneta
 Crisol Carabal as Rosario "Charito" Santana
 Ileana Jacket as Estrella Monsalve
 Karl Hoffman as Daniel Morales
 Gledys Ibarra as Pastora
 América Barrios as Madre Teresa
 Rosita Vásquez as Berta Aponte Vda. de Ruiz
 Guillermo Ferrán as Guillermo Guzmán
 Carmen Alicia Mora as Ana Leónidas Guzmán
 Omaira Coromoto Rivero as Susana Pérez
 Sandra Juhasz as Matilde Izaguirre
 Estrella Castellanos as Rita Monsalve
 Zulay García as Lucía Martínez
 Virginia Urdaneta as Carlota Martínez
 Manuel Carrillo as Carlos Alfredo "Cheíto" Martínez/Carlos Alfredo "Cheíto" Ruiz Guzmán
 Hylene Rodríguez as Mariana Ruiz Guzmán
 Dalila Colombo as Rosalba Maldonado
 Romelia Agüero as Blanca Cabrera
 Marisela Buitrago as Viviana López
 Helianta Cruz as Mónica Salvatierra
 Antonio Machuca as Jean Louis René Goduón
 Aidita Artigas as Balbina López
 Gabriela Gerbes as Silvia Oropeza
 Rita De Gois as Prof. Ninoska Sepúlveda
 Domingo del Castillo as Joaquín Martínez
 Manuel Gassol as Prof. José Rafael Pereira
 Alejandro Delgado as Dr. Freddy Avellaneda
 Laura Brey as Sonia "La Malvaloca" Ibarra 
 Ricardo García as Marcos "El Látigo" Rodríguez
 Marcial Coronado as Joao
 Elio Pietrini as Rubén
 Katherina Sperka as Tatiana
 Vicky Franco as Leandra
 Dolores Beltrán as Javiera
 Zuleima González as Pamela
 Alexander Montilla as Fernando
 Lolymar Sánchez as Zulayta
 Ileana Alomá as Elizabeth
 Bonnie Morín as Julia
 Carmen Landaeta as Ruperta
 Roberto Luque as León Felipe
 Vanessa as Sandra
 Ignacio Navarro as Gaitán
 Lourdes Medrano as Maruca
 Evelyn Berroterán as Chela
 Dante Carlé as Father Agustín
 Felipe Mundarain as Commissar Bressanutti
 Nelson Segre as Insp. Camacho
 Leonardo Oliva as Prof. Oropeza
 María del Pilar as Dir. Arismendi
 Iraima Díaz as Lolita

Theme song
The theme songs to Abigail were:

1. De carne y hueso - Pedro Pardo.

2. Selva - Elisa Rego (author: Jose Ignasio Martin).

3. Blanco y Negro Elisa Rego (author: Jose Ignasio Martin).

4. Ya no hay más que hablar María Jimena Pereira (author: Carlos Nilsson, Argentina Broadcast Telefe)

References

External links
 

1988 telenovelas
1988 Venezuelan television series debuts
1989 Venezuelan television series endings
RCTV telenovelas
Venezuelan telenovelas
Spanish-language telenovelas
Television shows set in Venezuela